Ghulam Dastagir Lak is a Pakistani businessman, landlord and a politician who was a Member of the Provincial Assembly of the Punjab, from May 2013 to May 2018. Mr Ghulam Dastagir Lak son of Mr Jahan Khan Lak has served as Member, Provincial Assembly of the Punjab during 1985-88, 1988- 90, 1990-93 and 1993-96 and operated as Minister for Food throughout 1985- 88 as well as Minister for Transport during 1993-96. He has actually returned to the Punjab Assembly for the 5th term in general political elections 2013-2018.

Early life
He was born on 27 April 1940.

Political career
He was elected to the Provincial Assembly of the Punjab as a candidate of Pakistan Muslim League (Nawaz) from Constituency PP-29 (Sargodha-II) in 2013 Pakistani general election.

References

Living people
Punjab MPAs 2013–2018
1940 births
Pakistan Muslim League (N) politicians